Nahj al-Haqq wa Kashf al-Sidq ( — "Way of rightness and discovering truth") is a book written by Allamah Al-Hilli (Died: 726). It presented claims that Sunnism was at odds with the Quran and that Shiism was the correct interpretation of Islam.

Author 
Abu Mansur Jamal Addin Hasan Ibn Yousuf Ibn Motahhar known as Allamah Al-Hilli (b.1250/died:1325) was the author. He is best known for his writing on jurisprudence and theology.

History 
Fazl Ibn Rouzbahan Isfahani wrote Ibtal Al Batel Va Ihmal Kashf Al Atel, which rejected Nahj al-Haqq wa Kashf al-Sidq. Shahid Qadi Nou Allah Shoushtari criticized the latter and defended Hilli in Ihqaq Al Haq.

Content 
The book considered eight major topics:

 The senses (Mahsousat) divided into seven subjects such as perception and conditions of seeing.
 Knowledge, divided into seven subjects such as necessity of knowledge by men of knowledge, knowledge on conclusions in assessments.
 God, divided into eleven subjects such as God's powers and lack of a corporeal form.
 Prophecy, divided into three parts such as the innocence of Muhammad's mother and father.
 Leadership, divided into four topics such as the qualities of an Imam.
 Resurrection, divided into two parts such as proving the existence of corporeal resurrection.
 Jurisprudence, divided into two parts such as religious duty.
 Jurisprudence (again), divided into seventeen parts.

References 

14th-century Arabic books
Shia fiqh